"You're Not the Only One Who Feels This Way" is Ammonia's second single from their second album Eleventh Avenue. Released ahead of the album, this song was the second big song for the band and is generally regarded as their second biggest song after "Drugs".

Originally written on the last day of recording after a phone call from the record company to Dave Johnstone. They advised him that there were no 'hits' on the album and could he please write one. After a near nervous breakdown, Dave wrote "You're Not the Only One Who Feels This Way" the next morning. Once the producer had arrived later in the afternoon the song was recorded. Johnstone proceeded to fax the record company that he had indeed "written their fucking single". Despite this the song remains one of their enduring legacies.

Reception
The song marks the second time Ammonia charted in Triple J's Hottest 100, coming in at No. 43 in 1997. The band's only other entry was "Drugs", which came in at No. 27 in 1995.

In 2018, Double J praised, "a song as simplistic, beautiful, powerful and just plain genius as "You’re Not The Only One Who Feels This Way".  If you haven't heard it in ages, I promise it still absolutely destroys today."

Track listing
"You're Not the Only One Who Feels This Way" – 3:53
"Pipe Dream" – 3:36
"Rough Night in Jericho" – 5:26

Charts

References

1997 singles
Ammonia (band) songs
1997 songs
Murmur (record label) singles